The Manhattans are an American popular R&B vocal group. Their songs "Kiss and Say Goodbye", recorded in 1976, and 1980's "Shining Star", both sold millions of copies. The Manhattans have recorded 45 hits on the Billboard R&B Chart, including twelve top-10 R&B hits in the United States, starting in 1965. Sixteen of their songs have reached the Billboard Hot 100, including two top 10s and a number-one hit with their song "Kiss and Say Goodbye". They also charted eight U.S. R&B top 20 Albums, three of which were RIAA certified gold.

Early history
The Manhattans, originally from Jersey City, New Jersey, formed in 1962 with members George "Smitty" Smith (December 28, 1939 – December 16, 1970), Edward "Sonny" Bivins (January 15, 1936 – December 3, 2014), Winfred "Blue" Lovett (November 16, 1936 – December 9, 2014), Kenny "Wally" Kelly (January 9, 1941 – February 17, 2015), and Richard "Ricky" Taylor (1940 – December 7, 1987). Bivins, Lovett, and Kelly graduated from Lincoln High School, while Taylor and Smith graduated from Snyder High School. All five enlisted in the armed forces and came together as a group following their discharges from their respective branches.

The group's first single was "For the Very First Time", released in 1964 by Carnival Records. The Manhattans continued recording successfully with songs written by various members of the group. In 1968, the group received the "Most Promising Group" award by NATRA (the National Association of Television and Radio Announcers). In 1969, the group moved to the De Luxe record label, a subsidiary of King Records, and subsequently embarked on a college tour. While playing at Kittrell College in North Carolina, the group met another group, the New Imperials, featuring Gerald Alston, nephew of The Shirelles' lead singer, Shirley Alston-Reeves. They were so impressed with Alston that they asked him to join the group, but he declined.

Misfortune hit the group late in 1970 when Smith fell ill. With him unable to perform, the group began to search for a new lead. First they attempted to woo The Cymbals' lead, Lee Williams, but he was unwilling to leave his current group. The group then renewed their request to Gerald Alston (born November 8, 1951), who accepted and took over the lead spot. Smith died of a brain tumor on December 16, 1970, 12 days before his 31st birthday.

The Manhattans continued recording throughout the 1970s with Alston singing lead vocals. They struck chart gold in 1973 with the Bivins-written song "There's No Me Without You". Then their biggest song was their March 1976 release "Kiss and Say Goodbye", written by Blue Lovett and arranged/co-produced with the group by the Philadelphia-based record producer Bobby Martin, a former member of the MFSB band of session musicians. The song quickly became a number-1 chart-topper on both the US Billboard Pop and R&B charts. It also became the second ever single to go platinum, after the RIAA introduced that certification level in 1976. Taylor left in 1976 to concentrate on his conversion to Islam. He died in 1987 after a long illness.

The group continued as a quartet, and found further success in March 1980 with the release of "Shining Star", which reached number 5 on the Billboard Hot 100 and number 4 on the R&B Chart. Produced and co-written by the Chicago-based record producer, Leo Graham, it received a Grammy Award the following spring.

In 1983, The Manhattans released the album Forever by Your Side, by Columbia Records, which had two singles that year. The first was the song "Crazy", the great success of this album, peaked at number 4 on the R&B chart. The second single was the title track "Forever by Your Side", which had moderate success in the United States, peaked at number 30 on the R&B chart, but has become a great success and a romantic classic in Brazil two years later, when it was included as part of the soundtrack of a soap opera in the country. The success led to a Portuguese version the following year, called "Pra Sempre Vou Te Amar", which also was successful in Brazil, and has been recorded by several Brazilian artists. Another highlight of this album Forever by Your Side was the song "Just the Lonely Talking Again", written by the American singer and songwriter Sam Dees, which was originally recorded by The Manhattans for this 1983 album and was later re-recorded by Whitney Houston on her second studio album, Whitney, in 1987.

The group celebrated its 20th anniversary in 1985 with the release of Too Hot to Stop It. It included the Evans/Smith-penned "When We're Made as One", originally recorded in 1966 but covered in an a cappella, doo wop style to emphasize the group's doo wop roots. The album was also dedicated to George Smith.

The group continued until 1988. That year, Alston left to record as a solo artist, scoring with several major R&B hits in the late 1980s and early 1990s for Motown. Roger Harris was recruited as the new lead singer for the group, which moved to the new label, Valley Vue, when their Columbia recording contract expired.

Later history
The group's largest shake-up was in December 1990, when Blue Lovett left the group, upon his doctor's request, for health reasons. Kenny Kelly left to return to college to pursue his PhD. Bivins continued along with lead singer Roger Harris who had replaced Gerald Alston in 1988–89 along with new members. He recruited new members Charles Hardy and Harsey Hemphill, who in October 1990 had auditioned for Bivins but didn't come aboard until after Lovett and Kelly left at the end of 1990. In early 1991 Bivins added Alvin Pazant, bringing the group back to a quintet. Harris proved to be only a short-term lead, and in April 1991 he was replaced by Wade Taylor. Taylor was replaced in July 1991 when Bivins recruited Lee Williams, the person whom they had originally wanted to replace George Smith.

In the 2000s, there were two versions of The Manhattans. One version featured original founding member Bivins, plus Hardy, Hemphill, Pazant and Williams. They released the CD Manhattans Now in 1994. In 1996, the group formed their own full-service music corporation company called Manhattan Entertainment Inc. In 2003 and 2007, they were featured artists in two theater plays, Girl He Aint Worth It and The Chicken Shack. In June 2013, the group released a single called "Just for Tonite" written by Bivins and Pazant and produced and arranged by Leroy Burgess. In 2015, Lee Williams retired and was replaced by Keni Jackson as the new lead singer. And they still continue to perform, with the same line up in 2018.

The other version of The Manhattans featured original member Blue Lovett, plus Gerald Alston, the lead singer on the group's biggest hits. Other members include Troy May and David Tyson (died 2022), brother of The Temptations' Ron Tyson. In the past, the group also featured Eban Brown, who later spent 18 years as lead vocalist for The Stylistics. This group has also released some CDs, including Even Now. This version of the group was featured in two PBS specials and performed at casinos and theaters across the United States. Alston appeared on Wu-Tang Clan's album, 8 Diagrams, on the song "Stick Me for My Riches" in 2007.

Edward "Sonny" Bivins, founding member of the Manhattans, died on December 3, 2014, at the age of 78. He sang on every Manhattans hit since the group's inception, and wrote many of their hit songs. He led the Manhattans up until his death.

Winfred "Blue" Lovett, the group's original bass singer and songwriter, died on December 9, 2014, at the age of 78. His bass voice was heard on many Manhattans hits, including the spoken word intro to "Kiss and Say Goodbye".

Kenneth "Wally" Kelly, the last surviving original member of the group, died on February 17, 2015, at the age of 74.

Lead singer Gerald Alston is the only member alive of the group's heyday lineup.

Discography

Studio albums

Live albums
Live from South Africa (1999, Classic World)

Compilation albums

Singles

Notes

References

External links

Official website The Manhattans of Sonny Bivins
The Manhattans Legacy 
Website of The Manhattans featuring Gerald Alston and Blue Lovett
The Manhattans at Wenig-LaMonica Associates
The 5-part Manhattans Story & the full discography at Soul Express
In Memory of The Manhattans
Gerald Alston talks about the CD, The Legacy Continues

1962 establishments in New Jersey
African-American musical groups
American soul musical groups
Ballad music groups
Columbia Records artists
Culture of Jersey City, New Jersey
Grammy Award winners
Musical groups established in 1962
Musical groups from New Jersey
Vocal quintets